Muhammad Amirul Haikal bin Mohamed Hassim (born 14 November 1999) is a Singaporean professional footballer who plays as a midfielder for Singapore Premier League side Tampines Rovers and the Singapore national team.

Career statistics

Club

Notes

International statistics

U19 International caps

References

Living people
1999 births
Singaporean footballers
Association football midfielders
Singapore Premier League players